Our Town is a play by Thornton Wilder.

Our Town may also refer to:

Film and television
 Our Town (1940 film), adaptation of the play starring William Holden and Martha Scott
 Our Town (2003 film), adaptation of the play starring Paul Newman
 Our Town (television), 1955 TV adaptation on Producers' Showcase
 Our Town (opera), adaptation by composer Ned Rorem
 Our Town (2007 film), South Korean film
 "Our Town" (The X-Files), episode from season two
 "Our Town" (The Vampire Diaries), an episode of the television series

Music
 "Our Town", an orchestral suite by Aaron Copland taken from the 1940 film
 "Our Town" (Cold Creek County song)
 "Our Town" (James Taylor song), from the 2006 Disney/Pixar animated film Cars
 "Our Town", a song by Marshall Crenshaw
 "Our Town", a song by Iris DeMent
 Our Town - The Greatest Hits, an album by Deacon Blue

Places
 Our Town, Alabama
 Ourtown, Wisconsin

See also
OT: Our Town, a 2002 documentary film